SS Coya is a 19th-century iron-hulled steamship on Lake Titicaca. After a long history carrying freight and passengers she is currently a floating restaurant.

History
Peru already had two steamships on Lake Titicaca; Yavari and Yapura. Increasing traffic had outstripped their cargo and passenger capacities so the Peruvian Corporation, a UK-owned company that had taken over Peru's railways and lake shipping in 1890, ordered a much larger ship to supplement them.

William Denny and Brothers of Dumbarton on the River Clyde, Scotland built Coya in 1892 in "knock down" form; that is, they assembled her with bolts and nuts at the shipyard, dismantled her into thousands of parts small enough to transport, shipped the parts to Lake Titicaca where she was reassembled with rivets and launched in 1893.

However, Coya continued in service on the lake.

In 1975 the Peruvian Corporation was nationalised and Coya'''s ownership passed to the state railway company ENAFER. In 1984 Coya was grounded by flooding of the lake that then receded and left her beached on dry land. In 2001 she was rescued, restored and refloated as a restaurant.Coya'' may be the oldest surviving Denny-built steamship in the World.

See also
List of ships built by William Denny and Brothers

References

1893 ships
Ships built on the River Clyde
Steamships of Peru